Rechnoy Vokzal ( (literally - River Passenger Station ) is a station on the Leninskaya Line of the Novosibirsk Metro. It opened on December 28, 1985.

Novosibirsk Metro stations
Railway stations in Russia opened in 1985
1985 establishments in the Soviet Union
Oktyabrsky District, Novosibirsk